Diamond Youth was an American alternative rock band from Baltimore, Maryland, with members from Chicago, Illinois and Richmond, Virginia.

History 
Diamond Youth began in 2010, under the name Diamond, with the release of a 7" on Photobooth Records titled DMND. In 2011, Diamond Youth released an EP titled Don't Lose Your Cool on Alliance Trax and Fita Records. In December, the band supported Four Year Strong on their brief holiday tour dubbed It's a Wonderful Gig Life.

In 2013, Diamond Youth released their third EP titled Orange on Topshelf Records. In March, they embarked on a two-week tour with Turnover and PJ Bond. In November and December, the band went on tour with Citizen, Polar Bear Club and Sainthood Reps. In February 2014, Diamond Youth released their fourth EP titled Shake on Topshelf Records. In April, the group supported I Am the Avalanche on their headlining US tour. In July, the group embarked on a UK tour with Citizen and Headroom.

In March 2015, Diamond Youth announced plans to release a full-length album. On May 19, 2015, Diamond Youth released their first full-length album titled Nothing Matters on Topshelf Records.  They split later that year, with Fang and Yates moving on to play in Turnstile.

Band members 
Justin Gilman – vocals, guitar (2010–2015)
Sam Trapkin – guitar (2010–2015)
Daniel Fang – bass (2010–2015)
Brendan Yates – drums (2010–2015)
Ian Hurdle – drums (2015)
Grayson Wallace – bass (2015)

Discography 
Studio albums
 Nothing Matters (2015, Topshelf)

EPs
 DMND (2010, Photobooth)
 Don't Lose Your Cool (2011, Alliance Trax + Fita)
 Orange (2013, Topshelf)
 Shake (2014, Topshelf)

Singles
 "Nothing Matters" (2015)

References 

Alternative rock groups from Maryland
Musical groups from Baltimore
2010 establishments in Maryland
Topshelf Records artists